Beaglehole Glacier is a glacier between Spur Point and Friederichsen Glacier on the east coast of Graham Land. It was named by the UK Antarctic Place-Names Committee after John Cawte Beaglehole, New Zealand historian of the Antarctic and biographer of Captain James Cook.

See also
 List of glaciers in the Antarctic
 Glaciology

References
 

Glaciers of Graham Land
Foyn Coast